Jack Dutton, SSAS, SD, SM, MMM (27 August 1928 – 29 November 2011) was a South African Army officer who served in the Korean War.

Early life

He was born in Tulbagh, Cape Province, and matriculated from Rondebosch Boys' High School in 1945. 

In 1947, he joined the Union Defence Forces.

Military career

In 1953, he was one of 12 officers sent to Korea where he was seconded to the Royal Tank Regiment. In 1964, he was appointed as Officer Commanding 1 Special Service Battalion. In 1968, he became Officer Commanding Eastern Province Command at the rank of Brigadier. He was then appointed Director of Armour. In 1973, he was promoted to major-general as Chief of Army Staff Operations from 1 July 1973. In 1976 he became Chief of Staff Operations with the rank of Lieutenant-general.

Diplomatic service

While still in the Army he was appointed South African ambassador to Chile.

Awards and decorations

 
 
 
  Korea Medal
 
 
 
 
  United Nations Service Medal for Korea 
  Korean War Service Medal
  Order of Bernardo O'Higgins

References

South African Army generals
1928 births
2011 deaths
Ambassadors of South Africa to Chile
Alumni of Rondebosch Boys' High School
People from Tulbagh
South African military personnel of the Korean War